Jagger–Richards (spelled Jagger–Richard from 1963 to 1978) is the songwriting partnership between English musicians Mick Jagger and Keith Richards, of the Rolling Stones. They are one of the most successful songwriting partnerships in history. In addition to Jagger and Richards' songwriting partnership, they have also produced or co-produced numerous Rolling Stones albums under the pseudonym The Glimmer Twins.

Similar to the contemporary songwriting partnership of John Lennon and Paul McCartney, both Jagger and Richards write lyrics and music.

History

Jagger and Richards have different recollections about their first songwriting endeavours but both credit manager Andrew Loog Oldham as the catalyst for their collaboration. Richards agrees that it was Oldham who pressed the pair to write songs after the duo had first emphasized other people's material; Oldham noted that there weren't that many obscure great songs out there for the band to cover. Richards recalled:

Jagger remembered it differently:

According to John Lennon, he and Paul McCartney might have been instrumental in inspiring Jagger and Richards to start writing their own material. In 1963 Lennon and McCartney gave the Stones one of their compositions, "I Wanna Be Your Man." In a Playboy interview in 1980, Lennon recalled:

The first original Jagger/Richards song to be released as the A-side of a Rolling Stones single was "Tell Me (You're Coming Back)", from their debut album. Released as a single in the US only, it peaked at number 24 on the charts there. The earlier "Good Times, Bad Times" had been released as the B-side to their cover of Bobby and Shirley Womack's "It's All Over Now". The band's first UK single featuring an A-side Jagger/Richards original was "The Last Time"; released in February 1965, it went to number one in the UK and number nine in the US.

Although most Jagger/Richards compositions have been collaborations, some of the songs credited to the famous partnership have been solo songwriting from either Jagger, whose examples include "Sympathy for the Devil" and "Brown Sugar", or Richards, whose examples include "Happy", "Ruby Tuesday", and "Little T&A". This is comparable to the Lennon–McCartney partnership, who also adhered to a tradition of joint credits even on numbers that were written by just one of the pair. Mick Jagger stated in his comprehensive 1995 interview with Jann Wenner of Rolling Stone magazine "I think in the end it all balances out."

On 26 June 2013, the duo's songwriting credits were handed over to BMG, marking the first time they would be managed by an outside company in over 40 years.

Co-credits
Jagger and Richards have shared credits with very few others. Among them are:

Jagger–Richards compositions released only by other artists
Jagger–Richards compositions that have been released only by artists other than the Rolling Stones include:
"That Girl Belongs to Yesterday", a January 1964 single by Gene Pitney
"Will You Be My Lover Tonight"/"It Should Be You", a January 1964 single by George Bean
"Each and Every Day", B-side of the February 1964 single "All I Want Is My Baby" by Bobby Jameson (London 45–9730).  The A-side was co-written by Richards and Andrew Loog Oldham.
"Shang a Doo Lang", a March 1964 single by Adrienne Posta
"So Much in Love", an August 1964 single by the Mighty Avengers, also recorded by the Herd (with Peter Frampton and Louis Cennamo) in 1966 and the Lonely Boys for their self-titled 1996 album.
"Act Together", on Ronnie Wood's September 1974 LP I've Got My Own Album to Do and the associated July 1974 The First Barbarians: Live from Kilburn concert (released in October 2007)
"Sure the One You Need", on Wood's I've Got My Own Album to Do and The First Barbarians: Live from Kilburn; and on the New Barbarians' May 1979 concert album Buried Alive: Live in Maryland (released in October 2006).
"Lonely at the Top", on Mick Jagger's February 1985 LP She's the Boss.

Production as the Glimmer Twins and origin of the name
Jagger and Richards adopted the nickname "The Glimmer Twins" after a vacation cruise they took to Brazil in December 1968/January 1969 with their then-girlfriends, Marianne Faithfull and Anita Pallenberg. An older English couple on the ship kept asking Richards and Jagger who they were. When they refused to reveal their identities, the woman reportedly kept asking, "just give us a glimmer" (as in "give us a hint about who you are"), which amused Jagger and Richards.

Jagger and Richards began to produce the Stones' albums under the pseudonym "The Glimmer Twins" starting with It's Only Rock 'n' Roll (released in 1974). The Glimmer Twins were the sole credited producers for the band's studio and live albums from then, up to and including Still Life (released in 1982). Starting with Undercover (released in 1983), the Glimmer Twins have shared production credit for the Rolling Stones albums with other producers, most frequently Don Was (five times) and Chris Kimsey (three times).

Besides their production work for the Rolling Stones, Jagger and Richards also used the Glimmer Twins for their co-production credit on Peter Tosh's album Bush Doctor, released in 1978. A rare exception to Jagger and Richards' use of the Glimmer Twins name for production credits appeared on John Phillips' Pay Pack & Follow album, recorded 1973–1979 and released in 2001, for which Jagger and Richards were credited as producers under their own names.

Legacy 
The partnership of Jagger and Richards has been described by Rolling Stone as the sixth greatest songwriter of all time. Rolling Stone considers the duo to have "defined a rock song's essential components...and established a blueprint for future rockers to follow."

See also 
The Rolling Stones discography
List of songs recorded by the Rolling Stones
Nanker Phelge
Lennon–McCartney

Notes

References

Sources

External links 
 Rolling Stones Discography
 Jagger/Richards Part I
  

The Rolling Stones
British songwriting teams
English rock music duos
Mick Jagger
Keith Richards
Male musical duos